Victor Morton Place (November 26, 1876 – June 16, 1923) was an American football player, coach, and lawyer.  He played college football at Dartmouth College from 1900 to 1902, serving as the team captain in 1902.  He served as the head football coach at Ohio Wesleyan University from 1903 to 1905, at the University of Washington from 1906 to 1907, and at the University of Notre Dame in 1908, compiling a career record of 30–24–6.  His single loss as Notre Dame's head coach was at an away game against the Michigan Wolverines, a significant football rival since 1887.

The following is a description of the 1909 Notre Dame team from Michael Steele's The Fighting Irish Football Encyclopedia:

"Victor Place [Notre Dame's coach in 1908] was replaced by Frank Longman, a former fullback for Yost from 1903 to 1905. He had coached at Arkansas and Wooster; at Wooster he had beaten Ohio State, the first time in 18 tries for the small school. In picking Longman, Notre Dame signalled [sic] the end of the domination of eastern personnel and methods."

Place died at Brookings, Oregon in a logging accident in 1923.

Early life and education
Place was born on November 26, 1876 in New Salem, Massachusetts.  He earned an LLB from Harvard Law School in 1906.

Head coaching record

References

1876 births
1923 deaths
American football tackles
Dartmouth Big Green football players
Notre Dame Fighting Irish football coaches
Ohio Wesleyan Battling Bishops football coaches
Washington Huskies football coaches
Harvard Law School alumni
People from New Salem, Massachusetts
Coaches of American football from Massachusetts
Players of American football from Massachusetts
Industrial accident deaths
Accidental deaths in Oregon